Li Dayin (born 12 February 1998) is a Chinese weightlifter and Asian Champion competing in the 81 kg division. He has set three world records and holds the snatch junior world record in the 81 kg division. He won the gold medal in the men's 81kg event at the 2022 World Weightlifting Championships held in Bogotá, Colombia.

Career

World Championships
In 2018 the International Weightlifting Federation updated the weight classes, and he competed in the newly created 81 kg division as the 2018 World Championships. The 81 kg competition saw 5 world records set and 11 junior world records set. In the snatch portion Li set two junior world records and was in third place after Lü Xiaojun and Mohamed Ihab exchanged world record lifts. In the clean & jerk portion of the competition he exchanged junior world records with Harrison Maurus, his final gold medal winning lift of 204 kg secured him the bronze medal in the total and junior world records in all lifts.

Other Competitions
He competed at the 2019 IWF World Cup (a qualifying event for the 2020 Summer Olympics) held in Fuzhou. He swept gold and set a new world record in the total with 375 kg.

Major results

CWR: Current world record
WR: World record

References

External links

1998 births
Living people
Chinese male weightlifters
World Weightlifting Championships medalists
21st-century Chinese people